Diplospora erythrospora is a species of plant in the family Rubiaceae. It is endemic to Sri Lanka.

Appearance
Shrub to Small tree.

Leaves
oval, base tapered, apex rounded to abruptly pointed, margin rolled down, glandular pits in vein axils beneath; petiole very short.

Trunk
branchlets stout, thickened at nodes; twigs compressed, glabrous.

Flowers
pale greenish yellow, small, nearly sessile; Inflorescence - dense cymes.

Fruits
ovaoid-subglobose berry, pulp purple; seeds bright red.

Ecology
montane forest understory

References

Endemic flora of Sri Lanka
Diplospora
Critically endangered plants
Taxonomy articles created by Polbot